The 2021 Cavan Senior Football Championship was the 112th edition of Cavan GAA's premier Gaelic football tournament for senior graded clubs in County Cavan, Ireland. The championship began on 2 September 2021. The tournament consists of 13 teams, with the winner going on to represent Cavan in the Ulster Senior Club Football Championship.

Crosserlough entered the championship as the defending champions, but exited the championship at the group stage.

Gowna and Ramor United contested the final on 7 November, and the game finished as a draw. The next week on 14 November, Ramor came out on top in the replay to secure their 5th senior championship, and their first since 2016.

The replayed final was the first senior men's county final in the country to be refereed by a woman, by Laragh United's Maggie Farrelly.

Team Changes
The following teams have changed division since the 2020 championship season.

To Championship
Promoted from 2020 Cavan Intermediate Football Championship
  Ballinagh  -  (Intermediate Champions)

League stage
All 13 teams enter the competition at this stage. A random draw determines which teams face each other in each of the four rounds. No team can meet each other twice in the group stage. The top eight teams go into a seeded draw for the quarter-finals, while the bottom four teams enter the relegation play-offs.

Round 1

Round 2

Round 3

Round 4

Round 5

Knock-Out Stage

Quarter-finals

Semi-finals

Final

Relegation play-offs
The 4 bottom placed teams the league phase will play off against each other. The 2 winners will maintain their senior status for 2022 while the 2 losers will be relegated to the 2022 Intermediate Championship.

References

External links
 Official Cavan GAA Website

Cavan SFC
Cavan Senior Football Championship
Cavan GAA Football championships